Alberto Escoto (born 27 August 1925) was a Cuban basketball player. He competed in the men's tournament at the 1952 Summer Olympics.

References

External links

1925 births
Possibly living people
Cuban men's basketball players
Olympic basketball players of Cuba
Basketball players at the 1952 Summer Olympics